Mary Beth Leonard (born 1962) is the current United States Ambassador to Nigeria and the former U.S. Representative to the African Union. Previously she served as the United States Ambassador to Mali from 2011 to 2014.

Early life 
Leonard is a native of Massachusetts. 
Leonard's father is Earl Leonard, a math teacher and vice principal.
Leonard graduated from Doherty Memorial High School in Worcester, Massachusetts.

Education 
Leonard graduated magna cum laude with a Bachelor of Arts from Boston University, with a major in economics and a minor in French. In 1988, Leonard earned a master's degree in international relations, with an emphasis on African studies, from the Johns Hopkins University School of Advanced International Studies. In 2004, Leonard received a Master's of Security and Strategic studies from the Naval War College, with distinction.

She speaks English, French, Spanish, Afrikaans, and Dutch.

Career 
Leonard began her career in the Defense Department as a research analyst.

In 1988, Leonard joined the State Department and entered the Foreign Service.  Leonard has served overseas as an economic and consular officer in Yaoundé, Cameroon; Windhoek, Namibia; and Lomé, Togo. Leonard also worked in the Department's Operations Center and in its Office of Central African Affairs. Leonard then served as political and economic officer in Cape Town, South Africa and thereafter as Deputy Chief of Mission in Paramaribo, Suriname.

From 2006 to 2009, Leonard was Deputy Chief of Mission in Bamako, Mali.
From 2009 to 2011, Leonard was the Director for West African Affairs at the U.S. Department of State.

On June 21, 2011, Leonard was nominated and confirmed on October 18, 2011, as the U.S. Ambassador to the Republic of Mali. Leonard's term ended in 2014. Leonard's service in Mali was recognized with the Department's Diplomacy for Human Rights Award in 2013, an honor that annually recognizes a U.S. Chief of Mission who has demonstrated extraordinary commitment to defending human rights and advancing democratic principles in his or her host country.
In September 2014, Leonard was a State Department's Diplomat in Residence for New England, based at Tufts University.
Leonard served as the State Department's Senior Faculty Advisor at the U.S. Naval War College in Newport, Rhode Island.

Leonard was appointed by President Obama as the Representative of the United States of America to the African Union, with the rank and status of Ambassador Extraordinary and Plenipotentiary, on July 5, 2016. She also served as U.S. Permanent Representative to the United Nations Economic Commission for Africa (UNECA).

On June 24, 2019, President Trump appointed her to become the U.S. Ambassador to Nigeria and on August 1, 2019, the Senate confirmed her nomination by voice vote. Leonard was sworn in on October 4, 2019, and presented her credentials to President Muhammadu Buhari on December 24, 2019.

Personal life
Leonard speaks French, Spanish, Afrikaans, and Dutch.

References

External links 
 Ambassador Mary Beth Leonard at U.S. Mission to the African Union
 

1962 births
Living people
Ambassadors of the United States to Mali
Ambassadors of the United States to Nigeria
Boston University College of Arts and Sciences alumni
Naval War College alumni
Paul H. Nitze School of Advanced International Studies alumni
Representatives of the United States to the African Union
21st-century American diplomats
American women ambassadors
21st-century American women
Doherty Memorial High School alumni
American women diplomats